Gonzalo Germán Vicente Maillot aka Gonzalo Vicente (born 22 December 1979 in Uruguay) is a Uruguayan football player.

Vicente played for Real Valladolid and Cádiz in the Spanish Segunda División.

References

1979 births
Living people
Uruguayan footballers
Uruguayan people of Italian descent
Uruguayan expatriate footballers
Liverpool F.C. (Montevideo) players
El Tanque Sisley players
Peñarol players
Venezia F.C. players
Real Valladolid players
Cádiz CF players
Serie B players
Segunda División players
Expatriate footballers in Italy
Expatriate footballers in Spain
Association football defenders